The Silahis International Hotel, later known as the Sofitel Grand Boulevard Hotel, is an abandoned hotel in Manila, Philippines.

History

Early years
The Silahis International Hotel was built in the 1970s, during a construction boom of hotels due to the then-upcoming hosting of the 1976 International Monetary Fund and the World Bank Summits by the Philippines. President Ferdinand Marcos streamlined the construction of several hotels in Metro Manila in anticipation of the international meetings. In addition to foreign business and leisure travelers, the hotel also accommodated nightclub partygoers and socialites. First Lady Imelda Marcos frequently hosted events in the hotel.

The hotel is owned by the Enriquez-Panlilio family who are involved in the real estate and shipping industry. They acquired the hotel from the Development Bank of the Philippines (DBP).

Sequestration by the PCGG
Following the deposing of President Marcos in the 1986 People Power Revolution which led to Corazon Aquino's installment as President, the national government seized properties of Marcos family and their associates. This was part of the Aquino's administration bid to recover the ill-gotten wealth. The Enriquez-Panlilio family was accused of acquiring the hotel from the DBP for an undervalued price and improper means. The Silahis Hotel was taken over by the Presidential Commission on Good Government (PCGG) in July 1989 which led to a years-long legal challenge by the Enriquez-Panlilio family disputing PCGG's seizing. The Sandiganbayan lifted the PCGG's sequestration orders, effectively reverting the hotel back to the Enriquez-Panlilios, which was upheld by the Supreme Court.

Sofitel
AccorHotels later took over the Silahis Hotel, rebranding it as the Sofitel Grand Boulevard Hotel. After its contract ended, AccorHotels acquired the nearby Westin Philippine Plaza, which it rebranded to the Sofitel Philippine Plaza Hotel in 2006.

Grand Boulevard Hotel
After AccorHotels disassociated with the Grand Boulevard Hotel, tax payment issues with the Manila city government marred the hotel. This led to the Manila government to auction off the associated property to Pacific Wide Realty and Development Corp. in November 2007 which was disputed by the original hotel owners. On July 9, 2008, the hotel ceased operations.

Architecture and design
The Silahis International Hotel was designed by architect Lor Calma. The hotel building which has 21-storeys was built along Roxas Boulevard near the Plaza Rajah Sulayman and Manila Bay.

Facilities
The Silahis Hotel has 600 rooms. It also hosted two noted nightclubs; the Stargazer of Louie Ysmael and a Playboy Club franchise. The hotel's Playboy Club operated from 1978 to 1991. Its interior is a Presumed Important Cultural Property due to being a work of Ildefonso P. Santos Jr., a National Artist of the Philippines.

References

Sofitel
Defunct hotels
Hotels in Manila
Abandoned buildings and structures
Buildings and structures in Malate, Manila